Silene coronaria, the rose campion, is a species of flowering plant in the family Caryophyllaceae, native to Asia and Europe. Other common names include dusty miller (this also refers to Centaurea cineraria and Jacobaea maritima), mullein-pink and bloody William. In the United Kingdom it is still widely referenced under its synonym Lychnis coronaria.

The Latin coronaria means "used for garlands".

Though short-lived, the plant readily self-seeds in favourable locations. It is sometimes grown as a biennial.

Awards
It has gained the Royal Horticultural Society's Award of Garden Merit, as has the white-flowered cultivar 'Alba'.

References

 Armitage, Allan M. (2001) Armitage's Manual of Annuals, Biennials, and Half Hardy Perennials, illustrated Asha Kays and Chris Johnson. Timber Press Inc., Singapore.

External links

Annual plants
Biennial plants
coronaria
Flora of Asia
Flora of Europe
Garden plants
Plants described in 1753
Taxa named by Carl Linnaeus